The 1934 Masters Tournament was the first Masters Tournament, held March 22–25 at Augusta National Golf Club in Augusta, Georgia. It was officially known as the "Augusta National Invitation Tournament" for its first five editions, but informally as the Masters from the start. 

CBS Radio broadcast updates daily, making this the second golf tournament to live broadcast. The sportscaster was Herbert H. Ramsay, former U.S. Golf Association president. This tournament also marked the return of Bobby Jones from retirement.

Horton Smith won the event with a  birdie putt at the 17th hole (now the 8th hole), and finished at 284 (−4), one stroke ahead of runner-up Craig Wood. (The current nines were reversed in 1934, switched to the current configuration prior to the 1935 event.) Tournament co-founder and host Bobby Jones finished ten strokes back at 294, tied for thirteenth place. The total purse was $5,000 and the winner's share was $1,500.

Course

The holes' current names (2013) are listed above; the current nines were switched for 1934 only.

Round summaries

First round
Thursday, March 22, 1934

Source:

Second round
Friday, March 23, 1934

Source:

Third round
Saturday, March 24, 1934

Final round
Sunday, March 25, 1934

Source:

References

External links
Masters.com – past winners and results
Augusta.com – 1934 Masters leaderboard

1934
1934 in golf
1934 in American sports
1934 in sports in Georgia (U.S. state)
March 1934 sports events